Cyperus perrieri is a species of sedge that is native to eastern parts of Africa.

See also 
 List of Cyperus species

References 

perrieri
Plants described in 2010
Flora of Tanzania
Flora of Madagascar